The Washington State History Museum is a history museum located in downtown Tacoma, Washington, United States. It is operated by the Washington State Historical Society under the official approval of the Washington State Legislature. The museum opened on August 10, 1996, at a building adjacent to historic Union Station that cost $42 million to construct.

The museum maintains three permanent exhibits. One is about the history of Washington state and its relation to the Pacific Northwest, featuring artifacts from women's suffrage, industrialization, Native American tribes and items such as Clovis points. The uppermost floor of the museum contains the History Lab, where visitors can explore and learn about history in a more hands-on fashion with multiple interactive exhibits. The museum hosts an annual Model Train Festival in December.

References

External links

The Washington State Historical Society
Exhibits at the Washington State History Museum – Exhibit information on the Washington State Historical Society's website
Educators' Portal – Information for teachers about field trips, the History Box program, curriculum modules, educator workshops, and the History Day program; plus a link to a free, downloadable version of the Washington State History Museum's Field Guide to Washington History.
WSHS Collections Catalog Online – Search the Collections Catalog of the Washington State Historical Society
Heritage Resources – Resources available to support the work of Washington heritage organizations, including workshops, the Heritage Capital Projects Fund grant program, and the Heritage Caucus of the Washington State Legislature.

Buildings and structures in Tacoma, Washington
Historical society museums in Washington (state)
History museums in Washington (state)
Institutions accredited by the American Alliance of Museums
Museums in Tacoma, Washington
State historical societies of the United States